The École des Mines de Nantes, or École nationale supérieure des mines de Nantes (Mines Nantes) is a French high-level engineering school (grande école), part of the  Institut Mines-Télécom. The school is based in Nantes, in the west of France. It was merged with Télécom Bretagne on 1 January 2017, and the new school's name is IMT Atlantique.

The school offers 10 majors:
 Energy (GSE)
 Decision-making software engineering (GIPAD)
 Logistics and production systems (GOPL)
 Management of Information Technologies (OMTI)
 Information Systems engineering (GSI)
 Quality and Safety (QSF)
 Automation (AII)
 Environment (GE)
 Nuclear: Technologies, Safety and Environment (NTSE)
 Nuclear: Systems and Technologies Applied to Nuclear reactors (STAR)
 Nuclear: Sustainable Nuclear Energy and Waste Management (SNEWM) - International master taught in English

The EMN has also signed agreements with Audencia Business School to offer a joint degree in management of information technologies. The school depend on the French minister of industry.

Teaching philosophy
Although it offers a fairly typical education for an engineering school, the EMN strives to give its graduate a practical, pragmatic approach to the technical and business skills it teaches. Manifestations of this philosophy include programs such as the "Apprentissage par l'action" ("Learning through action"), a case-based approach to sciences that places students in front of industry-inspired puzzles and develops students' analytic skills and intellectual curiosity. The EMN is also a partner of "La main à la pâte" ("Hands in the dough"), an innovative initiative to teach sciences in primary courses supported by Georges Charpak, who won the Nobel Prize in physics in 1992.

Programs taught in English
EMN offers four Master of Science programs fully taught in English:

 MOST (MSc in Management and Optimization of Supply Chains and Transport)
 PM3E (Master of Science in Project Management for Environnemental and Energy Engineering)
 ME3 joint masters (European joint Masters in Management and Engineering of Environment and Energy) in collaboration with four other partners (UPM Madrid, KTH Stockholm, BME Budapest and Queen’s University Belfast). This program has obtained the prestigious Erasmus Mundus label of the European Union.
 SNEAM (Master of Science in Sustainable Nuclear Energy - Applications and Management)

Other schools of Mines in France

 École nationale supérieure des Mines d'Albi Carmaux (Mines Albi-Carmaux)
 École nationale supérieure des Mines d'Alès (Mines Alès)
 École nationale supérieure des Mines de Douai (Mines Douai)
 École nationale supérieure des Mines de Nancy
 École nationale supérieure des Mines de Paris (Mines ParisTech)
 École nationale supérieure des Mines de Saint-Étienne (Mines Sainte-Etienne)
 École Nationale Supérieure des Mines de Rabat (Mines Rabat)

External links
Ecole des Mines de Nantes

Grandes écoles
Engineering universities and colleges in France
Educational institutions established in 1990
1990 establishments in France